Neuenstein is a town in the Hohenlohe district, in Baden-Württemberg, Germany. It is situated 12 km southwest of Künzelsau, and 27 km east of Heilbronn.

The 16th century castle, home to H.S.H. the prince of Hohenlohe-Oehringen, is open to visitors.

Mayor 

From 1999 to 2015 Sabine Eckert-Viereckel was the mayor. 
In February 2015 Karl Michael Nicklas was elected with 85% of the votes.

Sons and daughters of the town 

 Wendel Hipler (around 1465–1526), leader of the peasants in the German Peasants' War
 Wolfgang Julius, Count of Hohenlohe-Neuenstein (1622–1698), (Count of Hohenlohe-Neuenstein and imperial Generalfeldmarschall in the Turkish War

References 

Hohenlohe (district)